The statue honoring civil rights and women's rights activist Mary McLeod Bethune was unveiled in the United States Capitol in Washington, D.C., representing Florida in the National Statuary Hall Collection on July 13, 2022.  This makes her the first black American represented in the National Statuary Hall Collection.

The statue is made of Italian Carrara marble and was carved by Nilda M. Comas in Pietrasanta, Italy.

The statue replaced Confederate General Edmund Kirby Smith's statue in the Florida collection.

See also
 Mary McLeod Bethune Memorial
 Statue of Mary McLeod Bethune (Jersey City)

References

External links

Marble sculptures in the United States
Mary McLeod Bethune
Monuments and memorials in Washington, D.C.
Bethune, Mary McLeod
Sculptures of African Americans
Sculptures of women in Washington, D.C.